Aquilegia olympica is a species of plant belonging to the family Ranunculaceae.

Its native range is Turkey and Iran.

References

olympica